Khagendra Jamatia (c. 1954 – 2 March 2018) was an Indian politician.

A member of the Communist Party of India (Marxist) since 1983, Jamatia first represented the party while standing in the 1988 Tripura Legislative Assembly elections. He subsequently won reelection five consecutive times through 2013, and was again backed by the CPM in the 2018 election cycle. During his campaign, Jamatia was diagnosed with cancer, and died in the All India Institute of Medical Sciences in New Delhi on 2 March 2018, aged 64.

References

1950s births
2018 deaths
Deaths from cancer in India
State cabinet ministers of Tripura
Communist Party of India (Marxist) politicians from Tripura
Tripuri people
Tripura politicians
People from Tripura
Tripura MLAs 1988–1993
Tripura MLAs 1993–1998
Tripura MLAs 1998–2003
Tripura MLAs 2003–2008
Tripura MLAs 2008–2013
Tripura MLAs 2013–2018